The Electronic Surveillance Modernization Act ( of the 109th Congress) was passed on September 28, 2006, by a vote 232 to 191.  It has been referred to the United States Senate and the Senate Committee for the Judiciary for further debate. It died in the Senate.

Proposed legislation of the 109th United States Congress
United States federal privacy legislation